Wooly Boys is a 2001 American adventure comedy drama film directed by Leszek Burzynski and starring Peter Fonda, Kris Kristofferson, and Joseph Mazzello. The screenplay concerns sheep ranchers in the Badlands of North Dakota.

Plot
A.J. "Stoney" Stoneman (Peter Fonda), a grizzled sheep rancher from Medora, North Dakota, is tricked by Sheriff Hank Dawson (Keith Carradine) into taking a trip to see his daughter Kate Harper (Robin Deardan) in Minneapolis, Minnesota. While there, Stoney ends up bonding with his 16-year old grandson, Charles (Joseph Mazzello), whom he hadn't seen in nine years. Charles is also part of the plot to get Stoney help for a serious health issue. Charles tells Stoney his mother is in the hospital, so they leave for the hospital. Upon arriving at the hospital, Stoney finds out that Kate was only "in" the hospital to trick Stoney into having an examination. Stoney and Kate have a bout with words as Stoney is leaving and he collapses from an aneurysm, thereby causing him to be hospitalized. With the aid of his rancher pal, Shuck (Kris Kristofferson), Stoney escapes the hospital—with Charles in tow—for what becomes a life-changing adventure as Charles discovers his family roots and what it means to be a “wooly boy”.

Cast
Peter Fonda as A.J. "Stoney" Stoneman
Kris Kristofferson as Shuck
Joseph Mazzello as Charles
Keith Carradine as Sheriff Hank Dawson
Robin Dearden as Kate Harper

Production
Filming was done in the North Dakota towns of Medora, Belfield, Fryburg, and Beach; also in Minneapolis and Woodbury, Minnesota.

External links

2001 films
2001 comedy-drama films
American comedy-drama films
Films set in Minnesota
Films set in North Dakota
Films shot in Minnesota
Films shot in North Dakota
Films scored by Hummie Mann
2000s English-language films
2000s American films